Stanislav Katana (born July 11, 1992) is a Ukrainian footballer who plays for Canadian Soccer League club Toronto Falcons.

Club career

Ukraine 
Katana began his career with SC Tavriya Simferopol in the Ukrainian Premier League, but never featured in any matches. In 2010, he played with FC Dnipro-2 Dnipropetrovsk in the Ukrainian Second League.  

In 2013, he remained in the third division to sign a contract with Skala Stryi. In his debut season with Skala, he appeared in 26 matches and recorded 1 goal. Katana re-signed with the club for the following season. In his second season with Skala, he made 14 appearances.

Canada 
In 2015, he played abroad in the Canadian Soccer League with Toronto Atomic FC. He made his debut against Niagara United on May 10, 2015. He helped Toronto secure a playoff berth by finishing fifth in the First Division. Toronto was eliminated in the opening round of the postseason by SC Waterloo Region. In his debut season with the club, he recorded five goals. He would re-sign with Toronto for the 2016 season. Toronto again secured a playoff spot where they were eliminated from the competition by the Serbian White Eagles. In 2017, he played with Atomic's indoor team Ukraine AC in the Arena Premier League. 

For the 2019 season, he played with the expansion franchise Kingsman SC. Kingsman would defeat FC Vorkuta in the preliminary round of the playoffs. The club was eliminated from the playoffs in the second round to Scarborough SC. 

In 2021, he played at the amateur level in the Ontario Soccer League with FC Ukraine United. After a season in the OSL, he returned to the CSL in 2022 to sign with the expansion franchise Toronto Falcons.

References 

1992 births
Living people
Footballers from Dnipro
Ukrainian footballers
FC Dnipro-2 Dnipropetrovsk players
FC Skala Stryi (2004) players
Toronto Atomic FC players
FC Ukraine United players
Canadian Soccer League (1998–present) players
Association football midfielders
Ukrainian Second League players